The Dongfeng EQ2102 is a 3.5 tonne capacity troop/cargo carrier truck developed and built by Dongfeng Motor Corporation and used by the People's Liberation Army of the People's Republic of China for transport. The truck is based on the Nissan Diesel Condor CM series via the joint venture between Dongfeng and Nissan. 

When in civilian use, this series of trucks uses a variety of different names (from EQ1101 to EQ5108 depending on the version) but is usually referred to as the Dongfeng 145. A facelifted version is called the "160".

It entered service in the 1990s to replace the aging CA-30 and the EQ245/EQ2100.

Specifications

 Seating: 1+4 (EQ2102); or 1+2 (EQ2102G)
 Configuration: 6X6
 Weight (empty): 6,920 kg (without winch); 7,120 (with winch)
 Load: 5,000 kg (road); 3,500 kg (cross-country)
 Towed load: 4,800 kg
 Length: 7,495mm
 Width: 2.470mm
 Height: 3.240m (with canvas and bow kit)
 Wheelbase: 3,475mm / 1,250mm
 Track (front/rear): 1,876mm / 1,870mm
 Ground clearance: 305mm
 Max speed: 90 km/h

Variants

 1+4 (EQ2102)
 1+2 (EQ2102G)

References

 EQ2102 Truck

EQ2102
Trucks of China
Military vehicles of the People's Republic of China